Fred "Butch" Baird (born July 20, 1936) is an American professional golfer who played on the PGA Tour and the Senior PGA Tour (now known as the Champions Tour).

Early life
Baird was born in Chicago, Illinois. He learned the game at the age of 14 from his father. He turned pro in 1959 after working in the Texas oil fields for a few years after high school.

Professional career
Baird won two official PGA Tour events during his career: the 1961 Waco Turner Open and the 1976 San Antonio Texas Open. The San Antonio victory came 15 years, 5 months and 10 days after the Waco win, and was the record for longest time span between victories in PGA history until eclipsed by Robert Gamez in 2005. His career year came in 1976, when in addition to his San Antonio win, he finished 46th on the money list with $58,192. Also in 1976, came his best finish in a major championship — a T-4 at the U.S. Open.

Baird now lives in Scottsdale, Arizona as do many other professional golfers. He has a golf-memorabilia marketing business, BBJM Golf Enterprises, with partner Jack Mishler. His son, Briny, is also a professional golfer.

Professional wins (14)

PGA Tour wins (2)

PGA Tour playoff record (1–0)

PGA Tour satellite win (1)
 1967 West End Classic

Caribbean Tour wins (5)
1967 Los Lagartos Open
1968 Panama Open
1969 Panama Open, Maracaibo Open Invitational
1979 Panama Open (tie with Chi-Chi Rodríguez)

Other wins (3)
1965 PGA National Four-ball Championship (with Gay Brewer)
1968 Southern Texas PGA Championship
1974 Florida PGA Championship

Senior PGA Tour wins (2)

*Note: The 1989 Northville Long Island Classic was played over 16 holes for each round due to flooding.

Senior PGA Tour playoff record (1–1)

Other senior wins (1)
2007 Liberty Mutual Legends of Golf - Demaret Division (with Bobby Nichols)

Results in major championships

CUT = missed the half-way cut
"T" = tied

References

External links

American male golfers
PGA Tour golfers
PGA Tour Champions golfers
Golfers from Chicago
1936 births
Living people